Floreta Faber (born 19 March 1968, in Shkodër, Albania), is the Albanian ambassador to the United States.

Education 
Faber is a graduate of Tirana University, Faculty of Economics, in the Sphere of Circulation in 1990. From 1993 to 1995, she was enrolled in a two-year Master of Science Program for International Marketing & Strategy at the Norwegian School of Management in Oslo, Norway, including a period of studying as an exchange student at Washington State University. Her Masters Diploma in Marketing and Operational Management is awarded by MB University, in Albania. She has completed executive programs and training, such as International Visitor Leadership Program of the Department of States and Harvard University.

Career 
From 1990 to 1993, Faber worked in Shkodër at various organizations, including a local chamber of commerce, a regional business agency, and a public import-export company.

From 1995 to 2000, Faber worked at Deloitte & Touche in Tirana, Albania, and in Prague, Czech Republic. She helped open the Deloitte & Touche office in Tirana and worked in several positions.

After Deloitte & Touche, Faber worked as the Executive Director of the American Chamber of Commerce in Albania for 14 years. In this capacity, Faber worked with representatives of the Albanian and American governments, international organizations, and the EU, and similar business organizations in the United States and Europe.

In January 2015, Faber was appointed Albania's ambassador to the United States by then-president Bujar Nishani.

Personal life 
Floreta Faber is married to Dr. Edmond Faber, a vascular surgeon; they have a daughter Kesli (born in 2000) and a son Klint (born in 2003).

References

1968 births
Living people
Albanian women ambassadors
Albanian women diplomats
Ambassadors of Albania to the United States
People from Shkodër
University of Tirana alumni